Highclare School was founded in 1932 and is an independent primary and secondary school located on three sites in the Birmingham area providing children's education from 2 to 18 years.

Two sites are located in Sutton Coldfield, with the other being located in nearby Erdington. The Sutton Coldfield facilities are on the Lichfield Road in the Four Oaks area and in the Wylde Green area to the south, which houses the nursery.

See also
List of schools in Birmingham
Private school
Public school (UK)

References

External links 
 Highclare School Website

Private schools in Birmingham, West Midlands
Erdington